"Brass Monkey" is a song by the American rap rock group Beastie Boys. It was a single released from their first album Licensed to Ill. It is also on the Beastie Boys' compilation album Solid Gold Hits.

Background
It samples "Bring It Here" by Wild Sugar. The song features the Roland TR-808 drum machine.

The song is named after an alcoholic drink of the same name, which is mentioned several times throughout the song.

Cash Box called it a "scratchy rap send up."

Covers
The Dave Matthews Band covered this song at Jones Beach, New York in 2013. It was strung in with "Too Much" and "Ants Marching".

Richard Cheese covered the song on his studio album Aperitif for Destruction, as well as on his live album Viva la Vodka as a medley, interpolated with lyrics from "Intergalactic", "Ch-Check It Out", "Sabotage" and "Three MC's and One DJ".

Charts

References

External links 
 

1986 songs
1987 singles
Beastie Boys songs
Songs about alcohol
Songs about primates
Songs written by Rick Rubin
Songs written by Ad-Rock
Songs written by Mike D
Songs written by Adam Yauch
Def Jam Recordings singles
Columbia Records singles